The following Confederate States Army units and commanders fought in the Battle of Shiloh of the American Civil War. The Union order of battle is shown separately. Order of battle compiled from the army organization during the battle.

Abbreviations used

Military rank
 Gen = General
 MG = Major General
 BG = Brigadier General
 Col = Colonel
 Ltc = Lieutenant Colonel
 Maj = Major
 Cpt = Captain
 Lt = Lieutenant

Other
 (w) = wounded
 (mw) = mortally wounded
 (k) = killed in action
 (c) = captured

Army of Mississippi

Gen Albert S. Johnston (k)

Gen Pierre G. T. Beauregard

First Army Corps
MG Leonidas Polk

Second Army Corps
MG Braxton Bragg

Escort:
 Alabama Cavalry: Cpt Robert W. Smith

Third Army Corps
MG William J. Hardee (w)

Reserve Corps
BG John C. Breckinridge

Unattached

Notes

References
 U.S. War Department, The War of the Rebellion: a Compilation of the Official Records of the Union and Confederate Armies, U.S. Government Printing Office, 1880–1901.

American Civil War orders of battle